The International Kabaddi Federation is the international governing body of Kabaddi. Its membership comprises 31 national associations. The federation was formed in 2004. The founder and current president is Ashish Pachori from India. The other office bearers were: Mohammed Ali Pour (Iran), Khana Jawa (Japan), Veerawat (Thailand), Yoon Yeong Hak (South Korea), Ashok Das (United Kingdom); (Vice-president), Nisar Ahmed (Germany); (Secretary), R.M. Sunderashan (Malaysia); (Treasurer), Jaya Shetty (India); (CEO), and Shankarrao Salvi (India); (Adviser).

Members
The following countries are members of the International Kabaddi Federation: 

The non-member countries who have their national team are:

IKF Confederations
Asian Kabaddi Federation
European Kabaddi Confederation

IKF structured tournaments

Men's tournaments 
 Kabaddi World Cup
 Kabaddi Asia Cup 
Kabaddi Masters
 Kabaddi Junior World Cup

Women's tournaments 
 Kabaddi Women's World Cup
 Kabaddi Women's Asia Cup

Current title holders

Current IKF Rankings 
Points are calculated after every match by the formula:

10*(total number of kabaddi nations – rank of the opponent)+(score difference)

The top 10 teams according to the International Kabaddi Federation:

References

Sports organizations established in 2004
Kabaddi